Staveley is a small township in the Ashburton District, Canterbury, New Zealand.

Geography
Staveley is named for Robert Staveley, who was a runholder in the area and who had his own farm in this location. Staveley is located on the Inland Scenic Route, which is the former State Highway 72. Staveley is located on the Canterbury Plains, in the foothills to the Southern Alps. Springburn was the terminus of the Mount Somers Branch from 1889 to 1957.

Town facilities

In the centre of the township, there are a shop and cafe, an old school that now functions as a museum, a small church, a hall, and a small number of houses. The museum holds photos and artefacts of settlements in the vicinity of Mt Somers / Te Kiekie, a peak of  that is the backdrop to this parts of the Canterbury Plains.

Staveley Camp is located on Sawmill Road and is available to groups only. The facility is owned by the Mid Canterbury District Bible group, who purchased the site in 1959 and constructed buildings (bunk houses, a kitchen, and meeting rooms) in 1971.

Attractions

In 1949, locals built a natural ice rink. On busy days, the facility has hundreds of visitors.

Staveley has two historic lime kilns. The older one, believed to have been constructed prior to 1890, was damaged in the 2010 Canterbury earthquake and has since been closed. The other one was built in 1898 and can be visited by the public, with sign posts in Staveley giving directions to the site.

Ross Cottage at 63 Flynns Road is a historic cottage. In 1990, it was registered by the New Zealand Historic Places Trust (since renamed to Heritage New Zealand) as a Category II structure with registration number 5121.

References 

Ashburton District
Populated places in Canterbury, New Zealand